Southern Skyways is a virtual airline which markets air travel branding and is based in Atlanta, Georgia, USA. Southern Skyways is operated by and is a division of an Aviation Advantage, Inc., which is based also out of Atlanta, Georgia.

Aviation Advantage, Inc. / Southern Skyways primarily uses the certificated airline carrier lease charter services of:

 AirTran Airways
 Xtra Airways
 Swift Air
 USA Jet Airlines

Southern Skyways focuses on both domestic and international air service operations.

Destinations

United States

Georgia 
 Atlanta (Hartsfield-Jackson Atlanta International Airport)

Mississippi 
 Gulfport (Gulfport-Biloxi International Airport

See also 
 List of defunct airlines of the United States

References

External links 
Southern Skyways

Defunct airlines of the United States
Companies based in Atlanta
Airlines established in 1980